Jaan Hatheli Par is a 2013 Pakistani drama television series aired on Urdu 1 and PTV Home. Serial is produced by Amjad Hashmi. The drama centers around the valor and patriotism of Balochi's and also shows an insight into the situation in Balochistan.

Cast
Nadeem Baig as Meer Shahnawaz
Noman Ejaz
Asad Malik as Shamraiz
Syed Jibran as Shahwar
Sobia Khan
Saba Faisal
Madiha Iftikhar
Sherry Shah as Kashifa
Shamoon Abbasi
Maira Khan
Iftikhar Iffi
Agha Abbas
Faiza Gillani
Munazzah Arif as Kashifa's aunt
Rasheed Ali
Ahmad Taha Ghani
Amy Khan
Ash Khan
Aqsa Bukhari
Yamin Shah
Imran Tareen
Taufeeq Shah

References

External links
 Official Website

Urdu-language television shows
Pakistani drama television series
2013 Pakistani television series debuts
Urdu 1 original programming